Chiang Tai-chuan (born 26 October 1960 in Chiayi County, Taiwan) is a Taiwanese retired professional baseball player (position:outfielder) and currently a baseball coach. He is best known for being the first baseball player to compete in three consecutive Olympic Games: in the 1984, 1988 and 1992 Olympics where he won a bronze medal in 1984 (as a demonstration sport) and silver medal in 1992.

A member of China Times Eagles' amateur forerunner Black Eagles since 1990, after the 1992 Summer Olympics Chiang planned to join CPBL along with this soon-to-be-professionalized club. However, in November 1992, the Eagles accidentally traded him to Uni-President Lions due to its unfamiliarity with CPBL's trading rules. Chiang stayed with the Lions until the end of 1996 season. Before CPBL's 1997 season started, he planned to transfer to then just-established Koos Groups Whales, but also in this time CPBL expelled him after it was determined that he was be involved in The Black Eagles Incident. Chiang was forced to retire after this scandal and he later found a coaching job in the China Baseball League. He currently coaches Tianjin Lions.

Statistics
In the 1992 Olympics:

{|border=1　
|- style="background:LIGHTGREY" 
|hitting average||Games||At bat||Runs||Hits||RBI||Double||Triple||HR||K||Walk
|- 
||.310||9||29||2||9||4||4||0||0||5||8
|}

CPBL career:
{|border=1
|- style="background:LIGHTGREY"
|Year||Club||Games||At bat||Runs||Hits||Double||Triple||HR||RBI||Total bases||Walk||K||Stolen Base||Caught Stealing||Hitting Average
|-
|1993||Uni-President Lions||88||319||38||100||21||0||1||39||124||23||25||20||19||0.313
|-
|1994||Uni-President Lions||56||183||17||44||5||0||1||26||52||18||14||3||3||0.240
|-
|1995||Uni-President Lions||99||317||30||82||12||0||1||29||97||29||21||12||6||0.259
|-
|1996||Uni-President Lions||88||274||30||78||18||0||2||24||102||23||17||8||4||0.285
|}

External links

1960 births
Living people
Asian Games competitors for Chinese Taipei
Baseball coaches
Baseball outfielders
Baseball players at the 1984 Summer Olympics
Baseball players at the 1988 Summer Olympics
Baseball players at the 1990 Asian Games
Baseball players at the 1992 Summer Olympics
Fu Jen Catholic University alumni
Medalists at the 1992 Summer Olympics
Olympic baseball players of Taiwan
Olympic medalists in baseball
Olympic silver medalists for Taiwan
People from Chiayi County
Taiwanese baseball players
Taiwanese expatriate sportspeople in China